The American Anti-Vivisection Society (AAVS) is an organization created with the goal of eliminating a number of different procedures done by medical and cosmetic groups in relation to animal cruelty in the United States. It seeks to help the betterment of animal life and human-animal interaction through legislation reform. It was the first anti-vivisection organization founded in the United States.

History

The American Anti-Vivisection Society was founded by Caroline Earle White in 1883 in Philadelphia. The group was inspired by Britain's recently passed Cruelty to Animals Act 1876. The Society began with the goal of regulating the use of animals in science and society. After a few years, the intention switched from regulation to the complete abolition of vivisection in scientific testing. The first two members – Caroline Earle White and Mary Frances Lowell – worked with their husbands in the Pennsylvania Society to Prevent Cruelty to Animals (PSPCA), yet felt that their capabilities extended beyond what the PSPCA had to offer and, in 1869, founded the Women's Branch of the PSPCA (today known as the Women's Humane Society).

The first American animal testing facilities were opened in the 1860s and 1870s, much to the dismay of animal rights pioneers. Caroline White traveled to London to meet with Frances Power Cobbe, the woman who led the Victoria Street Society and had the Cruelty of Animals Act passed. Caroline White returned in 1883, full of ideas after speaking with Cobbe, and transformed the WBPSPCA into the American Anti-Vivisection Society. After two years the group was trying to have legislation passed, proposing the Bill to Restrict Vivisection, which was defeated. After gaining a bit of exposure, many in the medical field began siding with the AAVS. The biggest concern of the American Anti-Vivisection Society is the implementation of vivisection in medical testing. Mark Twain's sketch “A Dog’s Tale” was used by the Anti-Vivisection Society in its campaign against that practice. Additionally, it was issued by the British Anti-Vivisection Society as a pamphlet shortly after it was first published in Harper's Magazine in late 1903.

The AAVS has consistently worked on educating the public on issues regarding animal cruelty as well as worked with the U.S. Federal government in passing legislations for animal rights.

Publications
The organization's earliest publication was a magazine created in 1892 entitled the Journal of Zoöphily. The magazine informed its readers of recent vivisection and animal welfare issues, “encouraged readers to support humane education, and informed members about the society’s latest legislative ventures.” The publication changed its name a number of times, from The Starry Cross in 1922, the A-V in 1939, and resting finally with AV Magazine some years after that.  The AAVS has had radio programs, such as “Have You a Dog?” as well as occasional spots and commercials on radio and television.

Education

Animalearn was created in 1990 and is the AAVS’ educational department. The group intends to illustrate how science and biology can be taught in schools without actually using animals, like with dissection in the classroom. Animalearn conducts free workshops with educators nationwide to show how to teach science without the use of animals, as well as trying to incorporate animal-rights, in concept and practice, into the curriculum and educational environment of the school setting. The group has created what they call the Science Bank which is a program of “new and innovative life science software and educational products that enable educators and students to learn anatomy, physiology, and psychology lessons without harming animals, themselves, or the Earth.”

See also
List of animal rights groups

References

External links
The American Anti-Vivisection Society - Official site
American Anti-Vivisection Society - Online books

Organizations established in 1883
Organizations based in Philadelphia
Animal rights organizations
Anti-vivisection organizations
Animal welfare organizations based in the United States
1883 establishments in Pennsylvania